Luke Kevin Southwood (born 6 December 1997) is a professional footballer who plays as a goalkeeper for EFL League One club Cheltenham Town, on loan from EFL Championship club Reading. Born in England, he plays for the Northern Ireland national team. He once saved a mediocre penalty against Exeter City, in the highlight of his career so far.

Career

Club
On 11 May 2018, Reading announced that they had offered a new contract to Luke Southwood, with a new two-year contract being confirmed as signed on 2 July 2018.

On 7 May 2021, Reading announced that Southwood had signed a new two-year contract, keeping him at the club until the summer of 2023.

Loans
On 4 August 2017, Southwood joined Bath City on a six-month loan deal, which was extended until the end of the season on 3 January 2018. He was awarded player of the season after an outstanding year.

On 24 December 2018, Southwood joined Eastleigh on an initial one-month loan deal, with the loan being extended until the end of the season on 24 January 2019. Eastleigh managed to get to the semi finals of the National League play-offs with Southwood playing a key part in that, also getting player of the month in April.

On 1 August 2019, Southwood joined Hamilton Academical on loan until 5 January 2020. On 21 January 2020, Southwood signed a new contract with Reading until the summer of 2021, and then returned to Hamilton Academical on loan until the end of the season.

On 22 July 2022, Southwood joined Cheltenham Town on a season-long loan deal.

International
Southwood made his debut for the England under-19 team, play the first 45minutes in a 1–0 defeat to Mexico in June 2016.

Southwood was selected for the England under-20 team in the 2017 FIFA U-20 World Cup and was an unused substitute in the final where England beat Venezuela 1–0.

In November 2021, Southwood was called up to the Northern Ireland national team for the first time, for whom he qualified for through a grandmother. He debuted with Northern Ireland in a friendly 3–1 win over Luxembourg on 25 March 2022.

Career statistics

Club

International

Honours
England U20
FIFA U-20 World Cup: 2017

References

1997 births
Living people
Footballers from Oxford
Association footballers from Northern Ireland
Northern Ireland international footballers
English footballers
England youth international footballers
English people of Northern Ireland descent
Association football goalkeepers
Reading F.C. players
Bath City F.C. players
Eastleigh F.C. players
Hamilton Academical F.C. players
Cheltenham Town F.C. players
National League (English football) players
English Football League players
Scottish Professional Football League players